Events in the year 1883 in music.

Specific locations
1883 in Norwegian music

Events
October 22 – Opening of the first Metropolitan Opera House.
Friedrich Kiel is involved in a traffic accident from which he never completely recovered.
The Gretsch Company, manufacturers of drums, banjos and guitars, opens in Brooklyn, N.Y.

Published popular music
 "A Boy's Best Friend Is His Mother" w. Henry Miller m. Joseph P. Skelly
 "The Farmer in the Dell" trad
 "I Know Whom I Have Believed" w. Daniel W. Whittle m. James McGranahan
 "La golondrina" m. Narciso Serradell Sevilla
 "Polly Wolly Doodle (All The Day)" trad
 "Ring Dem Heavenly Bells" by Sam Lucas
 "She Does the Fandango All Over the Place" w.m. G. W. Hunt
 "There Is a Tavern in the Town" anon
 "Transit of Venus March" m. John Philip Sousa
"Must we leave the old home, mother?" w. by Arthur W. French, m. by William A Huntley

Classical music
Isaac Albéniz – Barcarola for piano No. 1
Anton Arensky
Piano Concerto in F minor, Op. 2
Symphony No. 1 in B minor
Johannes Brahms – Symphony No. 3
Emmanuel Chabrier – España, rapsodie pour orchestre
George Whitefield Chadwick – Thalia (concert overture)
Antonín Dvořák
 Piano Trio No. 3, Op. 65 (B. 130)
 Scherzo capriccioso, Op. 66 (B. 131)
 Hussite Overture, Op. 67 (B. 132)
Cesar Franck – Le chasseur maudit
Benjamin Godard – Piano Trio No.2, Op.72
Charles Gounod – The Redemption (oratorio)
Augusta Mary Ann Holmès – Pologne
Hans Huber – Piano Trio No.2, Op.65
Franz Liszt – La lugubre gondola (possible date of early version)
Emilie Mayer – Notturno, Op.48
Max Meyer-Olbersleben – Fantaisie-Sonate, Op.17
David Popper – Im Walde Suite, Op.50
Pablo de Sarasate – Carmen Fantasy
Sergei Taneyev – Canzona for Clarinet and Strings in F minor
Emil Waldteufel –Estudiantina

Opera
Alfredo Catalani – Dejanice
César Cui – Prisoner of the Caucasus
Charles-Édouard Lefebvre – Le Trésor premiered in Angers
Miguel Marqués – La cruz de fuego
Karel Miry – De kleine patriot (opera in 4 acts, libretto by J. Hoste, premiered on December 23 in Brussels)

Musical theater
 Cordelia's Aspirations (Edward Harrigan & David Braham) Broadway production opened at the New Theatre Comique on November 5 and ran for 176 performances
Johann Strauss II – Eine Nacht in Venedig (A Night In Venice) Berlin and Vienna productions

Births
January 30 – Peeter Süda, Estonian organist and composer (d. 1920)
February 11 – Paul von Klenau, Danish-born composer (d. 1946)
March 10 – Maria Barrientos, Spanish operatic soprano (d. 1946)
March 15 - Ford Dabney, American composer and vaudevillian (d. 1953)
March 16 – Ernie Hare, U.S. bass/baritone (d. 1939)
March 19 – Josef Matthias Hauer, Austrian composer and theorist (d. 1959)
March 21 – Jules Van Nuffel, Belgian composer and choir conductor (d. 1953)
March 27 – Dimitrios Semsis, Greek violinist (d. 1950)
March 28 – William Henry Harris, English organist, choral trainer and composer (d. 1973)
April 1 – Malcolm McEachern, Australian-born concert bass singer (d. 1945)
April 6 – Vernon Dalhart, U.S. singer
April 13 (O.S. April 1) – Alexander Vasilyevich Alexandrov, Russian Soviet composer
May 4 – Nikolai Malko, Ukrainian conductor
May 5 – Petar Konjović, composer (d. 1970)
May 28
George Dyson, English musician and composer (d. 1964)
Václav Talich, Czech conductor
Riccardo Zandonai, opera composer (d. 1944)
July 7 – Toivo Kuula, Finnish conductor and composer
July 25 – Alfredo Casella, composer (d. 1947)
July 29 – Manuel Infante, pianist and composer (d. 1958)
August 13 – Joseph C. Smith, American dance band leader (d. 1965)
August 15 – Benjamin M. Kaye, librettist (died 1970)
August 19 – Emilius Bangert, Danish composer and organist (d. 1962)
September 18 – Gerald Tyrwhitt-Wilson, 14th Baron Berners, British composer
October 2 – Frico Kafenda, Slovak composer
October 22 – Victor Jacobi, operetta composer (d. 1921)
November 8 – Arnold Bax, English composer (d. 1953)
December 3 – Anton Webern, Austrian composer (d. 1945)
December 22 – Edgard Varèse, French(-born) composer (d. 1965)

Deaths
January 24 – Friedrich von Flotow, composer (b. 1812)
February 13 – Richard Wagner, German composer (b. 1813)
February 17 – Napoléon Coste, guitarist and composer (b. 1805)
April 10 – Emilie Mayer, composer (b. 1812)
April 26 – Napoleon Orda, pianist, composer and artist (b. 1807)
June 6 
Ciprian Porumbescu, composer (b. 1853)
Per Lasson, composer (b. 1859)
June 10 – Karl Graedener, cellist, singing teacher and composer (b. 1812)
July 14 – Svend Grundtvig, Danish folk song collector (b. 1824)
July 27 – Franz Doppler, flute virtuoso and composer (b. 1821)
September 2 – Léon Halévy, librettist (born 1802)
October 4 – Giovanni Guicciardi, Italian opera singer (b. 1819)
October 30 – Robert Volkmann, composer (b. 1815)
December 7 – Auguste Offenbach, composer (born 1862)
December 3 – Gustav Hölzel, operatic bass-baritone (b. 1813)
December 11 – Mario, operatic tenor (b. 1810)
date unknown – Enrico Ceruti, violin maker (b. 1806)

References

 
1880s in music
19th century in music
Music by year